Syrian governors may refer to:

 List of governors of Damascus
 List of governors of Aleppo
 List of governors of Homs Governorate

See also 

 List of Roman governors of Syria